Rathoa Haryam Bridge, Mirpur, also known as the Islamgarh Bridge is a long bridge under construction in the Mirpur District of Azad Jammu Kashmir in Pakistan.

AZAD JAMMU & KASHMIR Rathoa Haryam Bridge: Length 5 km Long. Experts have said that 5 kilometers long, the bridge between New Mirpur City and Islamgarh.

The bridge will not only reduce the road link between Mirpur city and Islamgarh town to an unprecedented level, but will also reduce travelling time for commuters between district headquarters of Mirpur and Kotli, as well as between Mirpur and Dadyal sub-division.

The bridge will also open new vistas for the promotion of tourism in the region, the source added.

Kashmir's Longest Bridge in Mirpur Pakistan is now nearing completion (June-2017) with the final 2 pillars left. This is simulated design of how the final bridge will look like. The Haryam Rathoa Bridge is over 5 km Long and Spans the Mangla Dam reservoir in Azad Kashmir and has a suspension Bridge too.
at this moment the bridge did not complete because the ground is not suitable for pillars and still waiting for engineers to make the new plan to complete the bridge it may take longer time. As of October 2020 completion is still underway. It's believed  the final two pillars will have additional support of steel cables to help stabilise and strengthen these.

See also
Dhan Galli Bridge

References 

Bridges in Pakistan